Lhünzhub, or Ganden Chökhor is a small town, the administrative center of Lhünzhub County in the Lhasa Prefecture of Tibet, China. It is located northeast of Lhasa.

Lhünzhub has jurisdiction over six villages, with a population of 7349 people, all ethnic Tibetan. 
The economy is dominated by agriculture and animal husbandry.
The town has a primary school and a clinic. There is a small hydropower station.
The town lies on the Pengbo River.

References

Sources

Populated places in Lhasa (prefecture-level city)
Township-level divisions of Tibet
Lhünzhub County